The 2016 Maryland Republican presidential primary took place on April 26, 2016. The state sent 38 delegates to the 2016 Republican National Convention in Cleveland, of which Donald Trump won all. The Democratic Party held its primary the same day. Donald Trump won nearly every demographic group, some more than others.

Results

Vote by county
Donald Trump won every county (and the independent city of Baltimore).

See also
 2016 Maryland Democratic presidential primary

References

Maryland
Republican presidential primary
Maryland Republican primaries